Cedar Heights may refer to:

 Cedar Heights, Maryland
 Cedar Heights, New Jersey